The  Miss Kansas USA pageant is a competition that selects the representative for the state of Kansas in the Miss USA pageant. The pageant is directed by Vanbros and Associates, headquartered in Lenexa, Kansas. In 1992, the state joined the Vanbros group, under the directorship of Miss Kansas 1998 Jennifer Vannatta-Fisher.

Kansas did not place at Miss USA until 1973, the third-to-last state to make their first placement.  From then, no delegate from Kansas made the cut until 1991, when Kelli McCarty won the crown. McCarty's win makes Wichita, Kansas the only state to host one Miss USA and Miss Teen USA to win in their home state. This included two first runners-up, including Danielle Boatwright, winner of Survivor: Guatemala, one second runner-up, one third runner-up, and one fourth runner-up, among others. The most recent placement was Elyse Noe, placing Top 12.

Seven former Miss Kansas Teen USAs went on to win the Miss title, and also two Miss Missouri Teen USAs (Missouri is also a Vanbros state).

Elyse Noe, a native of Duluth, Minnesota, residing in Lawrence and a graduate of University of Kansas, was crowned Miss Kansas USA 2022 on May 8, 2022, at B&B Live and Music Theater in Shawnee. She represented Kansas for the title of Miss USA 2022, placed at the Top 12.

Gallery of titleholders

Results summary

Placements
Miss USAs: Kelli McCarty (1991)
1st runners-up: Danielle Boatwright (1996), Lindsay Douglas (2002)
2nd runners-up: Tavia Shackles (1993), Cara Gorges (2007)
Top 5/6: Kimberlee Girrens (1992), Tiffany Meyer (2000)
Top 10/12: Brenda Kopmeyer  (1973), Carol Hovenkamp (1994), Alyssa Klinzing (2019), Elyse Noe (2022)
Top 15/16: Bethany Gerber (2010), Gracie Hunt (2021)

Kansas holds a record of 13 placements at Miss USA.

Awards
Best State Costume: Tavia Shackles (1993)
Most Beautiful Eyes: Tavia Shackles (1993)
Best in Swimsuit: Danielle Boatwright (1996)

Titleholders

Color key

Notes

External links

References

Kansas
Kansas culture
Women in Kansas
Recurring events established in 1952
1952 establishments in Kansas
Annual events in Kansas